{{DISPLAYTITLE:Alpha2 Capricorni}}

Alpha2 Capricorni (α2 Capricorni), or Algedi , is a triple star system in the southern constellation of Capricornus. It is visible to the naked eye with an apparent visual magnitude of +3.57. It is separated from the fainter α¹ Capricorni by 0.11° of the sky, a gap just resolvable with the naked eye, similar to Mizar and Alcor. Based on parallax shift as refined from orbits around the sun of the Gaia spacecraft at earth's Lagrange point 2, the star is 101 to 103 light years from the solar system.

Properties
The primary, component A, is an evolved G-type star with a stellar classification of G8.5III-IV, indicating that the spectrum displays mixed traits of a giant and subgiant star. At the age of 1.3 billion years, is currently on the red giant branch and is generating energy through hydrogen fusion along a shell surrounding an inert helium core. The star has around double the mass of the Sun and has expanded to more than eight times the Sun's radius. The star is radiating 40 times the solar luminosity from its photosphere at an effective temperature of 5,030 K.

The secondary components B and C form a binary system that orbit each other with a period of about 244 years. Both stars have masses about half that of the Sun. They orbit the primary with an estimated period of around 1,500 years. As of 2010, the pair lies at an angular separation of 6.6 arc seconds from the primary along a position angle of 196°.

Nomenclature
α² Capricorni (Latinised to Alpha² Capricorni) is the star's Bayer designation. It bore the traditional names Secunda Giedi or Algiedi Secunda and shared the name Algedi (from the Arabic الجدي al-jadii 'the goat') with α¹ Capricorni. In 2016, the International Astronomical Union organized a Working Group on Star Names (WGSN) to catalogue and standardize proper names for stars. The WGSN approved the name Algedi for α² Capricorni on 21 August 2016 and it is now so entered in the IAU Catalog of Star Names.

See also
 Alpha Capricorni

References

External links

Capricorni, Alpha²
G-type giants
Capricornus (constellation)
BD-12 5685
Capricorni, 06
192947
100064
7754
Triple star systems
Algedi